Patiala railway station is a railway station serving Patiala city of Punjab in India. It is under Ambala railway division of Northern Railway zone of Indian Railways.

History
Unlike most railway stations, the building of Patiala railway station is perpendicular to the rail line from Rajpura. It is said that Maharaja built the railway station in the perpendicular orientation as he had hoped that one day the Ambala–Ludhiana would be diverted via Patiala, but that never happened. One reason was the trains would have to pay the taxes levied by the Pepsu state.

Overview
Patiala railway station is one of the 400 stations to be redeveloped under Government of India's AMRUT scheme. In 2016, the work for the platform-1 extension is in progress which shall be extended to another 200 meter to accommodate longest possible train. In 2016, electrification of Single broad-gauge railway line was under progress which is executed by Rail Vikas Nigam Ltd.

There are 5 platforms under use, 1(A), 1, 2, 3, 4. Platform number 4 is reserved exclusively for freight and passenger trains of Indian Army.

Electrification
The Rajpura–Patiala–Bathinda sector was electrified in 2019 and doubling is in process. In March 2017, work commenced for doubling of Rajpura–Patiala–Bathinda line, which is also a feeder route for Eastern Dedicated Freight Corridor (EDFC).

Passenger movement
Patiala City is amongst the top hundred booking stations of Indian Railway.

Amenities
Patiala City railway station has computerized reservation counters, GRP (railway police) office, retiring rooms, vegetarian and non-vegetarian refreshment rooms and book stall.

Railway workshop
Patiala railway workshop carries out a periodic overhaul of WDS-4 locos and breakdown cranes and locomotive manufacture.

References

Ambala railway division
Railway stations in Patiala district
Transport in Patiala